Apple Valley is a town in Washington County, Utah, United States, located  east of Hurricane along SR-59. The population was 701 at the 2010 census.

Apple Valley was incorporated on October 15, 2004, and a 2007 population estimate by the US Census Bureau placed its population at 427. In 2006, some town residents signed a petition calling for disincorporation, saying its incorporation was premature. They obtained enough signatures to call for a vote of dis-incorporation, but the attempt was unsuccessful. Another dis-incorporation vote took place on June 19, 2012, but was also unsuccessful.

Demographics

As of the census of 2010, 701 people were living in the town. There were 295 housing units. The racial makeup of the town was 94.3% White, 3.0% American Indian and Alaska Native, 0.1% Asian, 1.3% from some other race, and 1.3% from two or more races. Hispanic or Latino of any race were 3.3% of the population.

References

External links
 Official site

Towns in Utah
Towns in Washington County, Utah
Populated places established in 2004
2004 establishments in Utah